San Marino – United Kingdom relations date back to 1899, when the United Kingdom and San Marino signed an extradition treaty.

History
In 1899, the United Kingdom and San Marino signed an extradition treaty and a British consul general was appointed to San Marino in 1900.

During the Second World War, after neighbouring Italy declared war on the United Kingdom, San Marino was reported to have joined Italy in declaring war on Britain. However, the Sammarinese government later denied these reports.
Then, when Italy surrendered, San Marino declared neutrality. On 26 June 1944, the Allied Forces under British command erroneously bombed San Marino in the belief that it was harbouring German forces. On 21 September 1944, San Marino declared war on Germany.

Reparations

At UN-sponsored talks between 17 and 22 July 1961, the British government agreed to pay San Marino reparations to the sum of £80,000 for their part in the erroneous wartime bombing of the republic after the latter had filed a claim for 732 million lire.

Diplomacy

The United Kingdom maintains a Consulate General to San Marino in Rome. San Marino maintains a Consulate General to the United Kingdom in London.

See also
Foreign relations of the United Kingdom
Foreign relations of San Marino
Britons in San Marino

References 

Bilateral relations of the United Kingdom
United Kingdom